Penrose is a neighborhood in Arlington County, Virginia, USA, located roughly three miles from Washington, D.C. It is bordered by Joint Base Myer-Henderson Hall to the east, Columbia Pike to the south, S. Walter Reed Drive and S. Fillmore St. to the west and U.S. Route 50 to the north. The Naval Support Facility Arlington is located within the neighborhood boundaries. 

It is a multi-cultural neighborhood which includes houses from the early 1900s up to new construction. The neighborhood includes the Penrose Historic District. The neighborhood is a mix of single family homes, duplexes, townhouses, condominiums, and apartments. There are three public parks located throughout the neighborhood: Towers Park in the southeast corner of the neighborhood, Penrose Park, located in the center of the neighborhood, and Butler Holmes Park, located in the northern part of the neighborhood. 

The southern part of the neighborhood, bordering Columbia Pike, is made up of mixed use commercial and residential buildings, including a number of restaurants and stores. 

Penrose is less than 1 mile from Arlington National Cemetery, less than 2 miles from the Pentagon, the Foreign Service Institute, Pentagon City and the Pentagon City Metro Station, and less than 3 miles from Ronald Reagan Washington National Airport and the Arlington neighborhoods of Rosslyn and Shirlington. Neighboring Arlington neighborhoods include Lyon Park to the north and the Arlington Heights Historic District to the west.  

Neighborhoods in Arlington County, Virginia